Arbejder Sport Aarhus Fodbold, commonly known as ASA Fodbold, is the association football department of multi-sports club ASA, based in the neighbourhood of Frederiksbjerg, Aarhus, Denmark. Founded in 1933, the club mainly features football. Currently, the ASA's first men's team plays in the Denmark Series, the fifth tier of the Danish football league system, after reaching successive promotions in 2019 and 2021. 

ASA is the largest football club within Ringgaden (Ring 1) in Aarhus, defining the inner city. This had led to the club's nickname, "Klubben i centrum" ("The club in the centre"). The club has around 250 senior members and 320 youth members, making it one of the larger clubs in Aarhus.

History
In the 1930s, the Social Democrats had, as part of their cultural policy, which included a goal to end "bourgeoisie" elite sports, formed Dansk Arbejder Idræt (DAI). In short, the workers could meet each other under friendly conditions, and had loosely organised people to travel around the country to start workers' clubs. This is how ASA also started.
ASA stands for Arbejder Sport Aarhus ("Worker's Sports Aarhus") and was founded after a months diligent agitation in the social democrat newspaper Demokraten. Subsequently, the Social Democratic Youth of Denmark called De Unges Idræt og Arbejdernes Oplysnings Forbund ("Youth Sports and the Workers' Enlightenment Association")  to convene at the founding general assembly on 22 April 1933. Approximately 200 people had turned up to become members, and already the following week the first practice started on an allotted track between Aarhus Municipal Hospital and Nordre Cemetery. The contingent fee was DKK 1 per month, and 50 øre for the unemployed. The club's social democratic background quickly helped provide grounds and pitches for football. 

One of ASA's first chairmen was Orla Hyllested, who later became Mayor of Aarhus. As a result of the above social democrat connections, ASA already moved to its current grounds at the borough of Frederiksbjerg in 1934–35.

References

External links
Official website 

 
Football clubs in Denmark
Association football clubs established in 1933
1933 establishments in Denmark
Sport in Aarhus